The Secret Code (1942) was the 19th serial released by Columbia Pictures.  It features the masked hero "The Black Commando" facing Nazi saboteurs, inspired by Republic Pictures' successful Spy Smasher serial of the same year.  The chapters of this serial each ended with a brief tutorial in cryptography.

Plot
This serial introduces the World War II scenario when a masked hero tries to prevent Nazi agents from crippling the US's war effort. The spy ring is led by fifth columnist Jensen, who, with his lieutenant Rudy Thyssen and a network of Nazi saboteurs, is trying to get possession of a top-secret formula the United States had developed for manufacturing synthetic rubber while creating explosive gases and radio-controlled bombs to sabotage the exhausting war effort. Then Police Lieutenant Dan Barton stages a public dismissal from the police department, in order to join the saboteurs ring and learn the secret code they have been using. To further assist his efforts (especially after his superior, the only person to know that Barton is working undercover, is murdered), Barton assumes the secret identity of the Black Commando, a masked man who is wanted both by the villains (who want the secret formula they think he has) and police (who are also searching for Barton for murder). Finally, Barton steals the formula and is captured by Thyssen and put under the protection of the sabotage ring. Joining the gang, he learns of their plans, which he immediately leaks to his best friend and former partner Pat Flanagan and news reporter girlfriend Jean Ashley and, as "The Black Commando", continually frustrates the Nazi plots. After innumerable dangers and lost efforts in trying to decipher the enemy's secret codes, Barton and Flanagan discover the key to the Nazi code, capture the Nazi ring and make sure that the Nazi U-boat which has been waiting to help the Nazis escape is depth-bombed and destroyed.

At the end of each episode, the audience is given a short lecture on solving complex secret messages.

Cast
 Paul Kelly as Lt. Dan Barton/Black Commando
 Anne Nagel as Jean Ashley
 Beal Wong - Quito

Production
The hero, The Black Commando, was patterned after Spy Smasher.  Republic's Spy Smasher serial had been released several months before The Secret Code in 1942.  Columbia's adverts for The Secret Code included the phrases "Smash spies with the Secret Service" and "Thrill again to spy smashers' biggest chase!"

Each chapter ended with a quick lesson in cryptography and a "brief patriotic admonishment" given by Selmer Jackson.  Cline describes this as "propaganda in its basic form...delivered in the most effective way possible - by a respected authority figure in the person of one of Hollywood's most credible actors."

Anne Nagel and Wade Boteler, two of the stars of the Universal serials The Green Hornet (1940) and The Green Hornet Strikes Again! (1941) were reunited in this Columbia serial.

Release

Theatrical
The Secret Code was released in Latin America in May 1944, under the title La Clave Secreta, in English with Spanish subtitles.  This serial also was released as a feature film overseas.

Critical reception
Harmon and Glut consider the serial to be above average for a Columbia production.

Chapter titles
 Enemy Passport
 The Shadow of the Swastika
 Nerve Gas
 The Sea Spy Strikes
 Wireless Warning
 Flaming Oil
 Submarine Signal
 The Missing Key
 The Radio Bomb
 Blind Bombardment
 Ears of the Enemy
 Scourge of the Orient
 Pawn of the Spy Ring
 Dead Men of the Deep
 The Secret Code Smashed
Source:

See also
List of film serials by year
List of film serials by studio

References

External links

Cinefania.com

1942 films
American black-and-white films
1940s English-language films
American spy films
Columbia Pictures film serials
Films directed by Spencer Gordon Bennet
World War II films made in wartime
1940s spy films